Jason Gilbert, known by his nickname JG , is a Caymanian record producer, songwriter, mixing engineer and DJ. JG has produced for artists including Eminem, Bad Meets Evil, Akon, Christina Aguilera and Taio Cruz.

In 2011, Gilbert won a Grammy Award for his production work on Eminem's Recovery album.

Later in 2011, JG produced the first single off of Bad Meets Evil debut album. The single charted at #32 on the Billboard Hot 100.

JG is the founder of Happy Parrot Records and has a Master of Science in Finance degree from Florida International University (FIU). JG is the founder and member of DJ Group (Skorch Bun It).

Production discography

Albums

2010
 2010: Eminem - Recovery - 5. "W.T.P"

2011
 2011: Bad Meets Evil - Hell: The Sequel - 2. "Fast Lane"
 2011: Melanie Fiona - The MF Life - 17. "Like I Love You"
 2011: Taio Cruz - TY.O - 9."You're Beautiful"

2012
 2012: Machel Montano - Double M - 4."Whine"  6."Represent"
 2012: Christina Aguilera - Lotus - 10. "Around The World"

2013
 2013: Colette Carr - Skitszo - 4. "Racking Up"

2014
2014: Sebastian Mikael - Speechless - 10. "A Beautiful Life"
 2014: Chris Webby - Chemically Imbalanced - 15. "Stand Up"
 2014: Remy Ma - I'm Around - 8. "Go In Go Off"

2015
2015: Akon Feat. Stephen Marley - Stadium - "Just A Man"
2015: Genevieve - Show Your Colors  - 5. "Authority"

2016
2016: KLP (musician) - "Ember"

2018
2018: Kes (band) , Skorch Bun It & Sekon Sta - "Cabin Fever"
2018: 3LetterzNuk & Marco Foster - "I Wonder"

2019
2019: Kes (band) , Skorch Bun It & Lira (singer) - "Soca For Love"
2019: Kiana Ledé Feat. French Montana - "Ex" (Remix)
2019: Cool Blaze , Skorch Bun It & Sekon Sta - "Who Pay?!"

2020
2020: Jadakiss Feat. John Legend - Ignatius - "I Know"
2020: JoJo - Good to Know - "Bad Habits "
2020: Positive Soul & Jason Gilbert - Resilient

2021
2021: Machel Montano - The Wedding Album - "Teacher" & "2U"
2021: Skorch Bun It - Old Ting Riddim - All Songs
2021: Skorch Bun It , CoolBlaze & Timeka Marshall Feat College Boy Jesse - "Anything"
2021:  Skorch Bun It , CoolBlaze - Jogo Riddim EP
2021:  Skorch Bun It , CoolBlaze - Verde Riddim EP
2021:  Skorch Bun It , SugaRhe - On My Way
2021:  Skorch Bun It , Jay III - Ride

Singles
2011: Bad Meets Evil - Hell: The Sequel - 2. "Fast Lane"
2015: Akon Feat. Stephen Marley - Stadium - "Just A Man"
2016: KLP (musician) - "Ember"
2019: Kes (band) , Skorch Bun It & Sekon Sta - "Cabin Fever"
2019: Kes (band) , Skorch Bun It & Lira (singer) - "Soca For Love"
2019: Kiana Ledé Feat. French Montana - "Ex" (Remix)
2021: Skorch Bun It , CoolBlaze & Timeka Marshall Feat College Boy Jesse - "Anything"
2021: Skorch Bun It , Nialah Blackman - "Coffee"
2021: Machel Montano - The Wedding Album - "2U" (Co-Writer)

References 

Hip hop record producers
Caymanian songwriters
Living people
Year of birth missing (living people)